Noureddine Mahmoudi (born 27 June 1973) is a former professional tennis player from Algeria.

A 3-time national champion, Mahmoudi played in a total of 35 Davis Cup ties for Algeria between 1993 and 2003. In 2001, he lost a tight five-setter to then teenager Marcos Baghdatis, who represented Cyprus.

He is a son of Abdeslam Mahmoudi.

References

Algerian male tennis players
1973 births
Place of birth missing (living people)
Mediterranean Games bronze medalists for Algeria
Competitors at the 2001 Mediterranean Games
Mediterranean Games medalists in tennis
Living people
21st-century Algerian people